Pierce Township is one of thirteen townships in Washington County, Indiana, United States. As of the 2010 census, its population was 2,666 and it contained 1,146 housing units.

History
Pierce Township was organized in 1853. It was named for President Franklin Pierce.

Geography

Cities, towns, villages
 New Pekin (west half)

Unincorporated towns
 Farabee at 
 Shorts Corner at 
(This list is based on USGS data and may include former settlements.)

Adjacent townships
 Washington Township (north)
 Franklin Township (northeast)
 Polk Township (east)
 Jackson Township (south)
 Howard Township (west)

Cemeteries
The township contains these four cemeteries: Blue River Church, Mount Pleasant Church, Old Blue River and Wilson.

Lakes
 Jordan Lake

School districts
 East Washington School Corporation

Political districts
 Indiana's 9th congressional district
 State House District 73
 State Senate District 47

References
Notes

Bibliography
 United States Census Bureau 2007 TIGER/Line Shapefiles
 United States Board on Geographic Names (GNIS)
 IndianaMap

External links
 Indiana Township Association
 United Township Association of Indiana

Townships in Washington County, Indiana
Townships in Indiana
Populated places established in 1853
1853 establishments in Indiana